Shpat Qerimi (born 1 June 1989) is a former Kosovar footballer that played most of his career in Finland, with also spells in Germany and Croatia.

References

External links
 Profile at rops.fi  
 Profile at veikkausliiga.com  
 Article aboat Querimi at Jalkapallolehti  

1989 births
Living people
Sportspeople from Gjakova
Kosovan emigrants to Finland
Association football midfielders
Association football forwards
Kosovan footballers
Finnish footballers
Pallohonka players
FC Eintracht Norderstedt 03 players
RNK Split players
Rovaniemen Palloseura players
FC Espoo players
HIFK Fotboll players
Veikkausliiga players
Kosovan expatriate footballers
Finnish expatriate footballers
Expatriate footballers in Croatia
Kosovan expatriate sportspeople in Croatia
Finnish expatriate sportspeople in Croatia
Expatriate footballers in Germany
Kosovan expatriate sportspeople in Germany
Finnish expatriate sportspeople in Germany